Batman and Harley Quinn is a 2017 American animated superhero film produced by Warner Bros. Animation and distributed by Warner Bros. Home Entertainment. It is the 29th film of the DC Universe Animated Original Movies, and is directed by Sam Liu and written by Jim Krieg and Bruce Timm. It premiered on July 21, 2017 at San Diego Comic-Con and was released into participating theaters for one night only on August 14, 2017. The film was released on digital on August 15, 2017 and on DVD and Blu-ray on August 29.

Plot
Batman (Bruce Wayne) and Nightwing (Dick Grayson) discover that Poison Ivy (Pamela L. Isley) and the Floronic Man (Jason Woodrue) have teamed up, and that the criminals stole information (from S.T.A.R. Labs) about "Bio-Restorative Project" and Alec Holland who changed into Swamp Thing. Much to their reluctance, they decide to look for Harley Quinn (Dr. Harleen F. Quinzel; Poison Ivy's best friend and the Joker's usual sidekick and girlfriend) to find out where the duo is hiding; however, Harley has gone off the grid since getting paroled. Batman leaves finding Harley to Nightwing, while Batman figures out what the criminal duo are up to.

At A.R.G.U.S. HQ, Batman asks Sarge Steel about the kidnapping of a scientist named Dr. Harold Goldblum (with a background in chemistry, botany, and biological warfare). Sarge says they do not have any viable leads on who did the kidnapping.

Nightwing finds Harley working as a waitress at Superbabes restaurant where waitresses are dressed as superheroes and supervillains. Tailing her, Nightwing asks where he can find Ivy, Harley says she is done with superheroes & supervillains and wants to live a normal life. Nightwing asks her why she is in skimpy outfits for minimum wage instead of using her psychiatric training. He angers her saying she has not reported to her parole officer in months, and that he could drag her to jail. They fight, until she knocks him out.

Sarge shows Batman the home of Goldblum (where Goldblum was kidnapped), and Batman finds evidence that Floronic Man had been there.

Nightwing wakes up and finds he has been tied to a bed. Harley shows him a pile of rejection letters, showing her past as a super-criminal prevents her from getting rehired as a psychiatrist. Eventually, the two sleep together.

Ivy is kissing Goldblum every 6 hours so she can use her mind-controlling pheromones to keep him under control. The criminal duo complain about negative environmental impacts of humans, and Floronic says once their virus is activated every person on the planet "will have a vested interest in going green".

Nightwing and Harley are tickling each other – until Batman walks in on them – with the result being that Harley decides to help. Batman has concluded the criminal duo are using Goldblum to replicate the process (that turned Holland into Swamp Thing), but a virus version that will turn everyone into animal-plant hybrids.

Harley leads them to a popular hangout for henchmen, where she gets the location of Ivy from one of her old minions named Shrubby as Min and Max do a cover of Hamilton, Joe Frank & Reynolds' "Don't Pull Your Love". The trio head to Blüdhaven, where Ivy is saddened to see her friend helping Batman. Woodrue fatally wounds Dr. Goldblum to keep him quiet before he and Ivy escape as their lab catches fire. However, the dying Dr. Goldblum reveals that the duo is heading to Wainwright Swamp in Louisiana, where the correct swamp chemicals are.

Contacting A.R.G.U.S., Batman, Nightwing and Harley head after them to convince Ivy to stop her mad plans, realizing that even the slightest miscalculation could result in the extinction of all life on Earth. Harley resorts to crying to convince Ivy, who is finally swayed by their relationship. Swamp Thing appears, informing Woodrue that he would threaten the Green with his concoction. However, he will not interfere. Batman and Nightwing wonder how to stop Woodrue until Harley points out he is a plant and asks if they have a match. Grateful, they both give her a kiss on the cheek and Batman just sets Woodrue on fire.

In a post-credits scene, Harleen Quinzel now has a reality television game show, "Ask Dr. Quinzel", where she makes contestants run an elaborate obstacle course to win a year of therapy from a professional, in a scathing indictment of the American insurance system.

Voice cast
 Kevin Conroy as Batman / Bruce Wayne
 Melissa Rauch as Harley Quinn / Dr. Harleen Quinzel 
 Loren Lester as Nightwing / Dick Grayson
 Paget Brewster as Poison Ivy / Pamela Isley
 Kevin Michael Richardson as the Floronic Man / Jason Woodrue
 John DiMaggio as Sarge Steel, Swamp Thing / Alec Holland
 Eric Bauza as Wesley
 Robin Atkin Downes as Charles "Rhino" Daily
 Trevor Devall as Bobby Liebowitz
 Rob Paulsen as Dr. Harold Goldblum, Min and Max
 Mindy Sterling as Project Supervisor
 Bruce Timm as Booster Gold / Michael J. Carter (uncredited)

Production
The director is Sam Liu, who has directed prior DC animated films. The film is an original story written by Bruce Timm partnered with Jim Krieg. Kevin Conroy voices Batman and Loren Lester voices Nightwing, both of whom voiced those same roles in Batman: The Animated Series and in The New Batman Adventures. It is designed in the classic style similar to The New Batman Adventures, with Bruce Timm stating that the film is essentially a "48 Hrs."-style antics version of Batman and Harley Quinn teaming up. Notably, the film is much more comedic than the original series, with co-writer Jim Krieg stating "This is kind of a strange, red-headed nephew of Batman: The Animated Series, but don't show it to your kids thinking that it's Batman: The Animated Series, it is its own thing, kind of extrapolated."

The score was composed by Michael McCuistion, Kristopher Carter and Lolita Ritmanis, which was released on CD by WaterTower Records as an exclusive with FYE.

The animation was outsourced to DR Movie in South Korea.

Tie-in media
On July 31, a five-issue prequel miniseries called Harley Quinn and Batman was released on a bi-weekly basis via digital download. Written by Ty Templeton and drawn by Rick Burchett, the plot follows Harley as she looks to separate herself from the Joker and become a full-fledged supervillain in her own right. Afterwards, a seven-issue miniseries (which shares the same title as the film) was released on a weekly basis (also via digital download) starting on October 23. This serves as an anthology series that takes place after the events of the film and was worked on by various writers. Both miniseries were collected into a trade paperback which was released on March 7, 2019.

Publications
Batman and Harley Quinn (2018-03-07, hard cover, ISBN 1-4012-7957-0/978-1-4012-7957-8) 
Batman and Harley Quinn (2019-03-06, soft cover, ISBN 1-4012-8899-5/978-1-4012-8899-0)

Release 
Due to the financial success of The Killing Joke, the film was released in theaters for one night only through Fathom Events in the United States on August 14, 2017. The next week, a combo set with a Blu-ray copy, a DVD copy, and a digital copy was released.

Batman and Harley Quinns theatrical release grossed $32,671 in Australia and $6,420 in the Netherlands, bringing its international total to $39,091. The film earned $971,323 from domestic DVD sales and $1,182,647 from domestic Blu-ray sales, bringing its total domestic home video earnings to $2,153,970.

Reception

The film received praise for the voice performances of Conroy and Lester and throwbacks to past Batman media, but was criticized for the script, tone, and the more adult humor and risqué content.

Collider criticized the film's inconsistent tone, as well as its lack of resolution. Tyler Smith of Battleship Pretension criticized the more explicit sexual elements, writing, "As Batman and Harley Quinn attempts to incorporate more explicit sexuality – what could be considered 'adult content' – into the story, the film takes on the tone of a couple of 13-year-olds constantly high-fiving each other as they take turns writing risqué Harley Quinn fan fiction. I'm not exactly sure what the filmmakers were trying to achieve by treating the audience to gratuitous upskirt shots of Harley, but it certainly wasn't an attempt to make her a more well-rounded character. In fact, it's actually pretty dehumanizing."

IGN's review of the film was more positive, citing the throwback elements, aesthetics and fight choreography, but commented that the film is "self-indulgent" in its humor and "unbalanced between comedy and drama".

References

External links

DC page: movie

Batman and Harley Quinn at The World's Finest
Batman and Harley Quinn on Rotten Tomatoes

2017 comedy films
American direct-to-video films
2010s English-language films
2010s animated superhero films
2010s American animated films
2017 direct-to-video films
American action comedy films
Animated action films
Animated Batman films
American animated comedy films
Films based on works by Paul Dini
Harley Quinn in other media
DC Universe Animated Original Movies
Warner Bros. Animation animated films
Warner Bros. films
Films set in Louisiana
Films set in 2005
Films directed by Sam Liu
Animated superhero comedy films